Charles Walter W. Matthews (born 26 July 1991) is an English rugby union player for Top Challenge League side Kamaishi Seawaves. He plays as a lock.

Matthews attended Hurstpierpoint College in West Sussex, where he was Head Boy in his final year.

Matthews was selected for the England squad to face the Barbarians in the summer of 2014. The second-row previously also represented England at U20 level at the 2011 IRB Junior World Cup in Italy.

Charlie's great grandmother was the sculptor and artist Alice Bertha Moreton.

References

External links 

 Harlequin F.C. profile

1991 births
Living people
Rugby union players from Kingston upon Thames
English rugby union players
Rugby union locks
Harlequin F.C. players
People educated at Hurstpierpoint College
Alumni of Loughborough University
Wasps RFC players
Kamaishi Seawaves players